Father of the Bride Part II is a 1995 American comedy film starring Steve Martin, Diane Keaton, and Martin Short. It is a sequel to Father of the Bride and a remake of the 1951 film Father's Little Dividend, the sequel to the original Father of the Bride film released in 1950.

Plot
The film begins four years after the events of the first one, with George Banks telling the audience he is ready for the empty nest he will soon receive with all of his children grown up. Shortly thereafter, Annie tells the family that she is pregnant. George begins to mildly panic, insisting he is too young to be a grandfather. He has his assistant make a list of people who are older than him, dyes his hair brown, and decides he and Nina should sell the home their children have grown up in if one more thing goes wrong with it.

Termites strike the house two weeks later. George puts the house on the market without telling Nina, and sells it to the Habibs. At dinner, after a discussion on whether the baby's last name will be hyphenated or not, George reveals the house has been sold. Nina is livid, as she and George have to be out in ten days and have no place to go. The Bankses stay at the mansion owned by Bryan's parents. As the MacKenzies are on a cruise in the Caribbean, the Bankses have to deal with their vicious Dobermans, much to the chagrin of George, who is still paranoid from a previous mishap with them. Nina begins experiencing symptoms that bring up the concern of menopause. After visiting the doctor the following day, they are given the opposite news: Nina is pregnant, too.

Following the unexpected news of Nina's pregnancy, they have a chance meeting with Franck, Annie's former wedding planner, who is elated at both women expecting. As they are driving home, Nina and George have differing perspectives on the prospect of becoming new parents again. Both express how strange it will be, but begin to welcome the change. George has switched gears, now believing he is too old to be a father again. His feelings come to a head when he and Nina go to Annie's and Bryan's house to announce their news. Nina brings his insensitivity to light and tells him not to come home.

Out for a walk, George notices that the street to their old house is blocked off and sees a demolition crew with a wrecking ball at the house, learning that Mr. Habib plans to demolish it. An upset George runs in and tries to stop them as the wrecking ball is about to slam into the house. He pleads with Mr. Habib not to tear down the house since he is going to be a father again, as there is great sentimental value to it. He realizes that if he is going to have another child, he wants to raise it in the house in which his family grew up. When George offers to buy the house back, Habib agrees on the condition that George pay him $100,000 up front. Although reluctant to pay that money, he gives in. The Bankses then move back into their house. As a way to further apologize to Nina, George reluctantly hires Franck to do the baby shower. A few weeks before the baby is due Bryan is called away to an emergency meeting in Japan, leaving Annie in George and Nina's care.

Meanwhile, Nina and Annie are moving along in their simultaneous pregnancies and need around the clock care from George. Matty takes over when his father George is away at work. Franck turns simple redecoration of Nina and George's new baby's nursery into a full-scale renovation/addition, which he affectionately calls, 'the baby's suite'. Eventually, all the stress and nights of sleep deprivation wear George out. When 'the baby's suite' is revealed, Franck offers George some sleeping pills from his native country called 'Vatsnik' after George tells him that he has not been getting enough sleep. George unknowingly takes too high of a dosage and suddenly passes out during dinner. The family becomes worried, which is only increased when Annie finally goes into labor.

Franck takes over the role of driving the family to the hospital with a barely coherent George in tow. After being mistaken for a patient in need of a prostate exam, George finally regains full consciousness and goes to see Nina when she goes into labor. George is initially cynical about the female obstetrician who fills in because their own is unavailable. Despite wanting his grandchild to be delivered by the same doctor who delivered his children, George comes to terms with the arrangement. Bryan soon returns to be with Annie, who gives birth to a baby boy, while Nina at the same moment gives birth to a baby girl, named George and Megan, respectively. As George holds his grandson and daughter in his arms, he delivers the stand-out line of the movie - "Life doesn't get any better than this". George finishes telling the story about Nina and Annie's pregnancies. Bryan and Annie then move to Boston with baby George, since Annie took a job there. The film concludes with George standing on the road in front of his house, admiring it with Megan by his side. As he completes the story, he begins walking up the driveway, telling Megan about all the basketball tricks George will teach her.

Cast
 Steve Martin as George Stanley Banks
 Diane Keaton as Nina Banks (née Dickerson)
 Kimberly Williams as Annie Banks-MacKenzie
 George Newbern as Bryan MacKenzie
 Kieran Culkin as Matthew "Matty" Banks
 Martin Short as Franck Eggelhoffer
 Eugene Levy as Mr. Habib
 B.D. Wong as Howard Weinstein
 Jane Adams as Dr. Megan Eisenberg
 Peter Michael Goetz as John MacKenzie
 Kate McGregor-Stewart as Joanna MacKenzie
 Jay Wolpert as Dr. Brooks
 Susan Beaubian as Nurse Diana Blackwell (credited as Annie's Nurse)
 Roxanne Beckford as Nurse Suzanne Jones

Reception

Box office
In its opening weekend the film made $11.1 million from 1,949 theaters, finishing second at the box office.

Critical response
On Rotten Tomatoes the film holds an approval rating of 52% based on 23 reviews, with an average rating of 5.7/10. On Metacritic the film has a weighted average score of 49 out of 100, based on 16 critics, indicating "mixed or average reviews". Audiences polled by CinemaScore gave the film an average grade of "A−" on an A+ to F scale.

Roger Ebert of the Chicago Sun-Times wrote: "Father of the Bride Part II is not a great movie and not even as good as its 1991 inspiration. But it is warm and fuzzy, and has some good laughs and a lot of sweetness."

Soundtrack
Alan Silvestri returned to score the music for the film. The officially released soundtrack album contains the following 15 tracks:

 Give Me The Simple Life (by Steve Tyrell)
 Annie Returns
 Here Comes the Judge (Judge Tinkleberry's Theme)
 The Way You Look Tonight (by Steve Tyrell)
 Drivin' Me Crazy
 You Gotta Be Kiddin' Me
 When The Saints Go Marching In (by Fats Domino)
 Summer Montage
 George Walks
 Remembering Annie (Squirrel Montage) (by Ralph Waldman)
 Ain't Nobody Cheatin'
 Rush Down Corridor
 George Tells a Story About Divorce
 On the Sunny Side of the Street (by Steve Tyrell)
 End Credit Suite

Sequel
In 1996, Meyers confirmed that she and Shyer were planning a third installment in the Father of the Bride series, which would "have their characters confronting serious problems in their relationship – but ending up with a stronger bond than ever" -  though ultimately a sequel failed to materialize. In 2014, reports arose regarding a gay marriage themed Father of the Bride 3, reportedly again directed by Shyer, which was said to focus on a 29-year-old Matty Banks after he announces his engagement to the son of a US Navy Seal. Steve Martin denied the rumors on his social media, stating that he had neither seen a script, nor been offered the role.

On September 25, 2020, a mini-sequel titled Father of the Bride Part 3(ish) premiered on Netflix's official YouTube channel and Facebook, reuniting most of the original cast from the first two films, and was directed by Nancy Meyers. The short film also acted as a charity event, raising funds for the World Central Kitchen during the COVID-19 pandemic.

Controversy
In August 1997, American-Arab Anti-Discrimination Committee listed Father of the Bride Part II along with G.I. Jane and Operation Condor as examples of Disney produced and distributed films perpetuating negative stereotypes, in particular referring to Euguene Levy's character as Mr. Habib as "a grotesque Arab character."

References

External links

 
 
 
 
 

Father of the Bride (franchise)
1995 comedy films
1995 films
1990s pregnancy films
American comedy films
Remakes of American films
American sequel films
1990s English-language films
Films scored by Alan Silvestri
Films about families
Films directed by Charles Shyer
Films set in Los Angeles
Midlife crisis films
American pregnancy films
Films with screenplays by Charles Shyer
Films with screenplays by Nancy Meyers
Touchstone Pictures films
Films about father–daughter relationships
Films about parenting
1990s American films